The 2005 Heineken Open was a men's ATP tennis tournament held at the ASB Tennis Centre in Auckland, New Zealand. It was the 38th edition of the tournament and was held from 10 January to 17 January 2005 and played on outdoor hard courts. Fifth-seeded Fernando González won the singles title.

Finals

Singles

 Fernando González defeated  Olivier Rochus 6–4, 6–2
 It was González's 1st title of the year and the 6th of his career.

Doubles

 Yves Allegro /  Michael Kohlmann defeated  Simon Aspelin /  Todd Perry 6–4, 7–6(7–4)
 It was Allegro's 1st title of the year and the 2nd of his career. It was Kohlmann's only title of the year and the 3rd of his career.

References

External links
 
 ATP – tournament profile
 ITF – tournament edition details
 Singles draw
 Doubles draw

 
Heineken Open
Heineken Open, 2005
ATP Auckland Open
January 2005 sports events in New Zealand